The 1906 Nobel Prize in Literature was awarded to the Italian poet Giosuè Carducci (1835–1907) "not only in consideration of his deep learning and critical research, but above all as a tribute to the creative energy, freshness of style, and lyrical force which characterize his poetic masterpieces." He was the first Italian author to receive the prize and was followed by Grazia Deledda in 1926.

Laureate

Carducci started composing poetry while he was young, influenced by both the poets of his own time and those he had studied in the ancient and Italian periods. Rime ("Rhymes", 1857) was his debut book of poetry. In his active life he became an atheist, and the provocative poem Inno a Satana ("Hymn to Satan", 1865) is where he best displays his criticism of Christianity. Carducci confessed his sins and was reconciled to the Catholic Church in 1895. His other well-known poetry collections include Primavere elleniche ("Hellenic Springs", 1872), Odi barbare ("Barbarian Odes", 1877), and Giambi ed Epodi ("Giambi and Epodi", 1882).

Deliberations

Nominations
Carducci was nominated on 9 occasions starting in 1902 by Antonio Fogazzaro, an Italian Senator and author. In 1906, he received four nominations from academics and writers which eventually led him to becoming the year's recipient. 

The Nobel Committee of the Swedish Academy received 54 nominations for 24 individuals, among them Leo Tolstoy, Algernon Charles Swinburne, Selma Lagerlöf (awarded in 1909), Jaroslav Vrchlický, Georg Brandes, and Antonio Fogazzaro. Eleven of the nominees were nominated first-time such as Pedro Pablo Figueroa, Gaston Boissier, Louis Franck, George Lansing Raymond, Borden Parker Bowne, Angelo de Gubernatis, and William Booth. Selma Lagerlöf was the only female nominee recorded.

The authors Émile Boutmy, Eliza Brightwen, Ferdinand Brunetière, Ellen Mary Clerke, Anne Ross Cousin, José María de Pereda, Paul Laurence Dunbar, Max Eyth, Giuseppe Giacosa, Alexander Kielland, Jean Lorrain, Agnes Catherine Maitland, Bartolomé Mitre, Vasile Pogor, Charlotte Riddell, Hendrik Jan Schimmel, Elizabeth Missing Sewell, Eduard von Hartmann, and Adeline Dutton Whitney died in 1906 without having been nominated for the prize.

Prize decision
The decision to award Carducci is one of the least controversial in the history of the Nobel Prize in Literature. Carducci was the first and remain one of the few laureates who got all of the delivered votes from the members of the Swedish Academy.

Award ceremony
Due to Carducci's declining health, he was not able to receive the prize personally in Stockholm. Instead, the Swedish ambassador in Italy received it on his behalf.

Notes

References

External links
Award ceremony speech by C.D. af Wirsén nobelprize.org

1906